The Åland Sea (or the Sea of Åland;) is a waterway in the southern Gulf of Bothnia, between Åland and Sweden. It connects the Bothnian Sea with the Baltic Sea proper. The western part of the basin is in Swedish territorial waters while the eastern part is in Finnish territorial waters.

The Åland Sea has two sub-basins. The main basin is the Åland Sea proper, also called the northern Åland Sea basin. In the south, there is the smaller Lågskär Deep, also called the Lågskär Basin or the southern Åland Sea basin. The narrowest part on the northern edge of the basin is named the Southern Quark or South Kvarken. The trench running on the bottom of the Sea of Åland contains the second-deepest spot of the Baltic Sea, at a depth of 301 meters, which is second only to Landsort Deep. The mean depth of Åland Sea is 75 m, area 5,477 km2 and its volume is 411 km³. The Archipelago Sea and the Åland Sea regulate water exchange between Gulf of Bothnia and Baltic Proper.

Many ferries moving between Finland and Sweden cross the Sea of Åland.

The official English Language name of the sea area as defined by the Baltic Marine Environment Commission HELCOM, is "Åland Sea". The HELCOM nomenclature is also referenced by the International Council for the Exploration of the Sea (ICES). The same name is also used in scientific literature. Some other sources also use the name "Sea of Åland" in English.

References

External links

Baltic Sea
Bodies of water of Sweden
Bodies of water of Finland
Seas of the Atlantic Ocean
Landforms of Uppsala County
Landforms of Stockholm County
Gulf of Bothnia